Christ Church Lausanne is an Anglican Episcopal church in Lausanne, Switzerland.

Services are held in English every Sunday at 10.30 a.m., as well as on special days such as Christmas Eve, Christmas Day, during Holy Week and on Easter Sunday. A Sunday Club for children is held during regular Sunday Services during the school term. Study sessions take place during Advent and Lent. A number of more specific events are also organised throughout the year, such as the garden teas on Saturday afternoons during the summer.

The Church is set in a beautiful garden, planned and laid out by a well-known botanist, a former Church Warden of Christ Church and Honorary Curator of the Conservatory and Botanical Garden of the City of Geneva, renowned for classifying tropical African flowering plants. The Church garden is organised following a taxonomic approach, mainly featuring plants of the family Rosaceae. In addition to its roses, the garden contains a number of other interesting and beautiful plants, shrubs and trees.

History
There has been organised Anglican worship in Lausanne since 1816. The first recorded service took place on 10 November 1816, in the Chapelle de la Mercerie (St Etienne), just below Lausanne Cathedral. In 1822, the Revd Isaac Kendal Cheesbrough began his ministry as the first permanent Chaplain, and remained in office for 35 years until his death in 1857. During this period, the place of worship changed from the Chapelle de la Mercerie to the newly constructed church at La Croix d’Ouchy (Temple des Jordils). This construction was paid for by William Haldimand, a member of the English Church.

The new church was shared with the official Vaud Protestant parish, an arrangement that remained in place for the next 39 years. The English Church held two services every Sunday, one at 11.30 a.m. and one at 3.30 p.m. The congregation was large enough that in 1864, the Church Council decided to investigate the possibility of building their own church.

George Edmund Street, a distinguished English architect famous for his Gothic revival style, designed the building. The first stone was laid on 19 June 1877 at the site just off the Avenue d’Ouchy. The building work was completed rapidly and the church inaugurated the following year on 4 July 1878. The church was consecrated nine years later on 6 June 1887. The building was then enlarged by the addition of the south aisle in 1898, bringing the seating capacity up to 500; heating was installed at the same time.

Architecture
The building itself is considered a fine example of the neo-Gothic architecture popular in Britain during the reign of Queen Victoria. The exterior is a mixture of Swiss and English church architectural styles of the period. The shape of the main roof with the bell turret is local in style; but the porch with its saddle-back roof is English, as is the bonding of the external stonework. The interior also is typically English. The asymmetrical design (more obvious before the addition of the south aisle); the vaulted ceiling and roof timbers; the rectangular chancel; the columns with capitals and cylindrical abacus; and the paired windows with oculus are all English in style. The stained-glass windows, many commemorative, were designed by Clayton & Bell of London.

A small one-manual organ constructed by E.F. Walcker of Ludwigsburg was installed at the time of the original construction. The Swiss firm of Adolphe and Gustave Tschanun enlarged the organ in 1924 resulting in a three-manual organ commanding 29 ranks of pipes in five divisions. This beautiful instrument is still in use today and was renovated in 1995 by the current Churchwarden Dr David Elliott, retaining its original pneumatic action.

In 1986, Christ Church was declared to be a listed building in the Canton de Vaud. In spite of this, the upkeep of the building as well as all the Ministry expenses depend entirely on donations, contributions and the work of its members.

An ecumenical outlook
After almost two centuries of Anglican worship in Lausanne, the Christ Church community is an established part of the religious life of the city. Ecumenical contacts are maintained and promoted, and the Anglican Church was a founder member of the Ecumenical Council of Christian Churches in the Canton of Vaud, (La Communauté des Eglises chrétiennes dans le canton de Vaud, CECCV) formed in 2002.

Christ Church is part of the Archdeaconry of Switzerland in the Diocese of Europe, the 44th Diocese of the Church of England formed in 1980 to encompass the whole of mainland Europe. The Diocesan Bishop is the Bishop of Gibraltar in Europe. There are other churches of the Anglican Communion in Europe, namely the Episcopal Church of the USA, the Spanish Episcopal Reformed Church and the Lusitanian Church (Portugal). Full Communion is enjoyed with the Old Catholic Church (Bonn Agreement) and Scandinavian Lutheran Churches (Porvoo Agreement).

Our mission statement is "to be a welcoming place of worship, sharing God's love with all".

External links
  Christ Church - the Anglican Episcopal Church of Lausanne
  Church of England, Diocese of Europe
  Archdeaconry in Switzerland
  Willibrord Society

Anglican church buildings in Switzerland
G. E. Street buildings
Gothic Revival church buildings in Switzerland
Churches in Vaud